Roșiile is a commune located in Vâlcea County, Oltenia, Romania. It is composed of eleven villages: Balaciu, Cherăști, Hotăroaia, Lupuiești, Păsărei, Pertești, Pleșești, Rățălești, Romanești, Roșiile and Zgubea.

Natives
 Leontina Vaduva

References

Communes in Vâlcea County
Localities in Oltenia